Daniela Yordanova (Bulgarian: Даниела Йорданова)(born 8 March 1976 in Slivnitsa) is a Bulgarian middle distance runner who specializes in the 1500 metres. She tested positive for testosterone in an out-of-competition doping test in Sofia on 13 June 2008, which eventually got her kicked out of the 2008 Summer Olympics.

Achievements

Personal bests
800 metres - 2:03.02 s (2001)
1500 metres - 3:59.10 s (2004)
3000 metres - 8:30.59 s (2001)
5000 metres - 14:56.95 s (2000)
10,000 metres - 32:40.23 s (2006)

References

External links

1976 births
Living people
Bulgarian female middle-distance runners
Bulgarian sportspeople in doping cases
Athletes (track and field) at the 2000 Summer Olympics
Athletes (track and field) at the 2004 Summer Olympics
Olympic athletes of Bulgaria
Doping cases in athletics
World Athletics Championships medalists
European Athletics Championships medalists
20th-century Bulgarian women
21st-century Bulgarian women